New Waterford (Irish language: Port Lairge Ùr) is an urban community in the Cape Breton Regional Municipality of Nova Scotia, Canada.

Geography
Formerly known as Barrachois (from barachois, meaning small port, lagoon or pond), its present name is likely derived from the Irish seaport Waterford, from which many early settlers came. Coal mining in the vicinity began as early as 1854 at Lingan and later at Low Point in 1865.
New Waterford is located northeast of Sydney, Nova Scotia. It is located near the ocean and is bordered on one side by cliffs. New Waterford has a rather flat terrain and has several fresh water lakes located nearby.

Economy

New Waterford is a fishing port and former coal-mining community that has been in economic decline in recent years. There are ongoing efforts to revitalize the area's economy including a slow but steady increase in jobs in the technology sector. Many residents had been reliant on the coal and steel industries, which are now closed. The last local mine closed in 2001.

Demographics
Senior citizens make up a disproportionate number of town residents due to a long running unemployment problem and the economic development plans of the government which focused on propping up older declining industries. This had the effect of worsening employment prospects for younger workers resulting in a large migration of these younger workers from New Waterford to other areas of the country where opportunities were available.

Eight-thirty whistle
At 8:30pm every day the local fire department sets off its siren.  This has a long history, and continues in tradition to this day.  The original intent of the whistle was for curfew.

History
The first inhabitants of the area were the Mi'kmaq whose lifestyle was centred around hunting and fishing.

The historical industry in New Waterford has been coal mining. The creation of steam powered machines during the industrial revolution led to a demand for the coal deposits of Cape Breton and northern mainland Nova Scotia. Mining in the area started as early as 1854. The Dominion Coal Company began operating in New Waterford in 1907 drawing in many workers mainly from Irish and Scottish Catholic backgrounds. The name likely comes from the Irish city of Waterford.

New Waterford was incorporated as a town in 1913.

On July 25, 1917, 65 people were killed in a coal mine explosion at New Waterford's No. 12 Colliery.

Demand for coal peaked during the Second World War after which it competed with oil and has been in sharp decline ever since. As a result the coal industry in New Waterford has declined and many of its residents have moved elsewhere in the country to look for work.

No. 12 Colliery Mine Explosion 
On the morning of July 25, 1917, an explosion erupted in the Dominion Company No.12 Colliery in New Waterford. The explosion occurred about 2000 feet below the surface. At the time 270 miners were working inside the mine.

Methane gas and coal dust that was accumulated in the shaft due to poor ventilation were ignited resulting in the large explosion. The blast itself killed 62 miners aged 14–65 and resulted in many other injuries. Rescue efforts began immediately following the explosion. Firemen and miners including those from nearby mines which were closed after the blast, entered to aid in the rescue. 3 miners who entered the mine to help with rescue efforts were killed from exposure to gasses.

In total, 65 men died because of the explosion making it the worst coal mining disaster to happen on Cape Breton Island to date.

The Dominion Coal Company insisted that the ventilation in the mine was in working order despite the many miners who claimed that it was not and that there had been gas built up in the mine. a coroner's inquiry began to investigate the cause of the explosion and found the Dominion Coal company was guilty of gross negligence. The Amalgamated Mine Workers of Nova Scotia charged the company with criminal negligence and three of their officials with manslaughter. The crown prosecutor in the case had previously defended the Dominion Company did not bring in any evidence against the company. The presiding judge on the case had also previously worked on behalf of the company and instructed the jury to find the defendants not guilty.

In 1922, a monument was erected with the names and ages of the workers who were lost in the explosion to commemorate the loss of life and the courage of the people who assisted in the rescue effort.

Coal Strike of 1925 
In the 1920s, the British Empire Steel Company controlled most of the coal mines in Nova Scotia. Due to the declining global demand for coal and having made unrealistic promises to its shareholders, Besco intended to cut the wages of miners and crack down on their ability to unionize and strike. Throughout the 1920s, the coal miner's unions clashed with Besco throughout the early 20s with multiple strikes being quelled by the police and armed forces.

In 1925, contract negotiations had failed and the miners went on strike on March 6, leaving a small workforce to prevent the mines from becoming flooded and to keep the power plant in service for the town and hospital. Besco intended to wait out the strike rather than settle with the striker's demands. By June the economic impact of the strike was felt heavily as families were close to starvation, the workers nonetheless "stood the gaff". On the 4th of June, company police forced the workers out of the power plant and shut off water and power to the town. On June 9, the workers went on a 100% strike. On June 11, a large group of miners marched on the plant and were met by the company police who fired shots into the crowd, killing 38 year old William Davis and wounding several others. Now a full blown angry mob, the miners stormed the plant and destroyed it. The miners rounded up 30 of the company police and marched them into the jail. In the days following Davis' death, miners looted company stores and collieries were burned. Soldiers from the Canadian Armed Forces were called in to restore order. It marked the largest deployment of the Armed Forces for a domestic conflict since the Northwest Rebellion of 1885.

On June 25, the Nova Scotia's Conservative party won the general election after 43 years of Liberal government and began working with Besco and the strikers to come to a settlement. On the 5th of August, a settlement was reached and workers once again returned to the mines.

Every year on June 11, miners across Nova Scotia abstain from working on what is known as William Davis Miner's Memorial Day to commemorate William Davis who was killed by Besco company police, along with all miners who have died in the coal mines of Nova Scotia.

In popular culture
The town was the setting for the 1999 comedic coming-of-age film New Waterford Girl. New Waterford Girl is a drama about Moonie Pottie, a gifted teenager, who dreams of life beyond her small town. She becomes inspired when a 15-year-old girl from New York moves in next door. Starring many local actors and mostly Canadian talent, it is set in the mid 1970s. Most of the scenes in the movie were actually filmed in the town of North Sydney.

Canadian author Ann-Marie MacDonald set her #1 bestseller “Fall on Your Knees” in New Waterford, set in the early 20th century.

The song 'Auction Days' by Canadian artist Jon Brooks is set in New Waterford and describes the social collapse caused by the loss of so many men to war and the mines.

Events and celebrations

Coal Dust Days

Coal Dust Days is a week-long community celebration that takes place approximately the third week of July. The Coal Dust Days parade, Plummer Avenue Day, the tavern tour, and fireworks display are some of the many events that take place during the week.

Davis Day

Davis Day is a commemoration of the death of a Cape Breton miner, and father of 10, William Davis. He was shot dead by the coal company security force at Waterford Lake during a mining strike on June 11, 1925. Davis was not participating in the protest, which took the form of a march from the company power plant (by Waterford Lake) and ended by the railroad tracks between Daley Road and May Street. He was shot along with two other men, who survived.  Davis Day is also known as Miners Memorial Day.

Coal Bowl

New Waterford is the site of the annual Coal Bowl Classic basketball tournament, which brings in teams from all across Canada to compete in a week long event. The tournament, first held in 1982, takes place at Breton Education Centre in early February. In 2009, the Breton Education Centre Bears won the tournament for the first time lifting the "Coal Bowl curse".

References

External links
 "Standing the Gaff in the Coal Mines" Cape Breton University Library

"New Waterford No 12. Colliery Mine Explosion,1917" Historic Nova Scotia
 "Coal Mining" Museum of Industry Nova Scotia

"1917 New Waterford Mine Disaster" Disaster Songs

Communities in the Cape Breton Regional Municipality
Former towns in Nova Scotia
Mining communities in Nova Scotia
General Service Areas in Nova Scotia
Populated places disestablished in 1995